Vasily Vasilyevich Rochev (born 23 October 1980 in Syktyvkar, Komi ASSR, Russian SFSR) is a Russian cross-country skier who has competed since 2000. He won the bronze medal in the Team sprint event at the 2006 Winter Olympics at Turin.

Rochev has four medals at the FIS Nordic World Ski Championships with a gold (Individual sprint: 2005), two silvers (Team sprint and 4x10 km: both 2007), and one bronze (4x10 km: 2005). He has won fourteen events in cross-country skiing since 2002.

He is the son of Vasily Rochev who won two medals at the 1980 Winter Olympics in Lake Placid, New York (gold: 4 x 10 km, silver: 30 km), and two medals at the 1974 FIS Nordic World Ski Championships in Falun (silver: 4 x 10 km, bronze: 15 km).

He is the second husband of fellow Russian cross-country skier Yuliya Chepalova, who gave birth to her second child Vaselina in April 2007. Chepalova had another child in 2003 from a previous marriage.

Cross-country skiing results
All results are sourced from the International Ski Federation (FIS).

Olympic Games
 1 medal – (1 bronze)

World Championships
 5 medals – (1 gold, 2 silver, 1 bronze)

World Cup

Season standings

Individual podiums
2 victories – (2 ) 
8 podiums – (7 , 1 )

Team podiums
 3 victories – (1 , 2 )
 9 podiums – (5 , 4

References

External links
 
 
 

1980 births
Living people
Russian male cross-country skiers
Cross-country skiers at the 2002 Winter Olympics
Cross-country skiers at the 2006 Winter Olympics
Olympic cross-country skiers of Russia
Medalists at the 2006 Winter Olympics
Olympic medalists in cross-country skiing
Olympic bronze medalists for Russia
FIS Nordic World Ski Championships medalists in cross-country skiing
People from Syktyvkar
Sportspeople from the Komi Republic